8world News is a department which produces news, current affairs, and info-ed programmes for two Mediacorp channels aired in Mandarin, Channels 8 and U.

Prior to 2010, the news were presented in three timeslots - News 8 At One (Chinese:1点新闻), which airs daily; Singapore Today (Chinese:狮城6点半), and News 8 at 10. (Chinese:10点新闻). With the reduction of MediaCorp News Group employees and the increased demand for more variety programme content on Channel U, MediaCorp announced that the news programmes on Channel U would end with effect from 29 March 2010. News 8 at 10 would then air at 11.00pm there, as a new title called News Tonight (Chinese:晚间新闻).

Beginning from 20 October 2014, Hello Singapore (Chinese: 狮城有约) took over Singapore Today on weekdays, with news segments at 6.30pm and 7.00pm, it was broadcast live on weekdays & News 8 At One will not be broadcast on weekends.

Channel 8 News started broadcasting on new headquarters 1 Stars Avenue starting 13 March 2017, leaving the former headquarters Caldecott Hill after the broadcast of News Tonight on 12 March 2017. This move also brings an overall change for news graphics, subtitles, and the upgrade of hardware.

On 1 April 2021, News 8 At One, Hello Singapore and Singapore Today started including Chinese subtitles.

Presentation
There are different news presenters every day for news programmes. There are two news presenters on the weekday version of News Tonight, but mostly a single presenter presents the news in every timeslot. Highlights of the day's news are shown in a ticker found on the left side of the screen on Channel 8, and in the form of a commentary during the credits of the weekday 9.00pm drama.

Exceptions
The news timeslots are mostly fixed. However, there are some exceptions: 
On National Day (9 August), Hello Singapore (weekday) or Singapore Today (weekend) would be moved earlier to facilitate the live broadcast of the National Day Parade.
On the day of the National Day Rally, Singapore Today would be presented at 6:15pm, 15 minutes earlier before the live broadcast of the National Day Rally speeches at 6.45pm.
News Tonight is not presented on Polling Day of the Singapore General Elections.
No commentaries for News Tonight were made for Channel 8 since 2020.
Commentaries would not be heard at the end of the drama series during the credits, regardless of production company (e.g. Wawa Pictures, Mediacorp Studios Malaysia), whether if there are no featurettes, promotions, theme songs or snippets. The Ultimatum was the first drama series to air without commentaries, while Crescendo became the first non-Mediacorp Studios produced drama to air without commentaries. Hero was the first show with neither of the 4 conditions to have no commentary but only for the first episode, subsequent episodes had commentaries.
Channel U aired its first "live" edition of News Tonight at 11:00pm on 5 May 2013. This is the first time Channel U did so in three years, to present the live results of the 2013 Malaysian general election.
During the period of National Mourning from 23 to 29 March 2015 in lieu of the death of Lee Kuan Yew, all MediaCorp channels presented the highlights and latest news regarding Mr Lee. There is a change to the music at the start and end of every news programme, to a much melancholic tune. All programmes aired on MediaCorp channels were also pre-empted for a week, to air the latest news regarding Mr Lee. There was also a 15-minute special edition of News 8 at One on 28 March 2015 (Saturday).

Filmography

News

Current Affairs

References

Television news in Singapore
Mediacorp